Decree Law 4161/56 was an Argentine government decree designed to suppress Peronist sentiment among the Argentine people. Enacted on 5 March 1956, six months after the 1955 overthrow of President Juan Perón in the Revolución Libertadora, the decree instituted a wide-ranging ban on any "affirmation of Peronism" under the government of Pedro Eugenio Aramburu.

Decree Law 4161/56

The decree officially outlawed the "affirmation of Peronism, publicly performed, or Peronist propaganda, by any person, whether by individuals or groups of individuals, associations, unions, political parties, corporations, legal entities of public or private images, symbols, signs, significant expressions, items and artwork doctrines, intending genuine or could be taken by anyone as such owned or used by individuals or bodies representative of Peronism."

The law explicitly prohibited images of the former president and even went as far as to outlaw mentioning the names of both the former president and his wife Evita, a woman particularly popular with the poor Argentines of the working class, as Article I of the decree banned not only the "photographs, portraits, and sculptures" of the former president but also the very names of Juan and Eva Perón, the names of Perón's officials, and other symbols and references to the Peróns, the former administration, and the Justicialist Party. Two musical works which celebrated Juan and Eva Perón  Marcha de los Muchachos Peronista and Evita Capitana  were banned explicitly.

Aramburu himself only referred to Perón as "the monster" and newspapers identified him as "the fugitive tyrant." Anthropologist Antonius Robben describes the shouting of Perón's name as "a small act of resistance" under Aramburu.

Footnotes

References

External links
 Decree Law 4151/56 at El Historiador. 

1956 in Argentina
Anti-Peronism
Law of Argentina
Censorship in Argentina
Political repression in Argentina
4161/56